Persatuan Sepakbola Mitra Kutai Kartanegara is an Indonesian association football club based in Tenggarong, Kutai Kartanegara, East Kalimantan. They currently compete in the Liga 3.

History
This club was founded in 1979 as NIAC Mitra. NIAC stood for New International Amusement Center, a major casino in Surabaya during the 1970s. In 1983, the team played a friendly match against Arsenal F.C., winning by 2–0. NIAC was dissolved by its owner, Alexander Wenas, on 24 September 1990.

The club was revived under the name of Mitra Surabaya in 1993. After relegation to the First Division, the club moved to Palangkaraya, Central Kalimantan and were renamed Mitra Kalteng Putra (MKP) in 1999. At the end of 2001 season, the club was relegated to the Second Division. Financial problems led the club to be loaned to Suryanto Anwar, after which they moved again, to Tenggarong, Kutai Kartanegara, East Kalimantan, where they received its current name. The new ownership had a great impact. At the end of the 2003 season, Mitra Kukar were promoted to the First Division. In the 2005 season, the new owner fully bought Mitra Kukar. By the end of 2007 season, Mitra Kukar succeeded to be promoted to the Premier Division, after finishing first in the First Division. In the 2010–11 Premier Division, Mitra Kukar was promoted to the Indonesia Super League after finishing third in the final round.

Sponsorship

Shirt sponsors
 Petrona
 Bank Kaltim

Other sponsors
 ABP
 PT. Beton Kaltim
 Kaltim Post

Kit provider
 2015–present: Joma

Honours

As NIAC Mitra
 Galatama
 Champions (3): 1980–82, 1982–83, 1987–88
 Runners-up: 1988–89
Aga Khan Gold Cup
Champions: 1979

As Mitra Kukar
General Sudirman CupChampions:''' 2015

Performance in AFC competitions
As NIAC Mitra:

Coaching staff

Management

Notes

References

External links
Official site

Kutai Kartanegara Regency
Football clubs in Indonesia
Football clubs in East Kalimantan
1979 establishments in Indonesia
Association football clubs established in 1979